The 1998 Challenge Cup, known as the Silk Cut Challenge Cup for sponsorship reasons, was the 97th staging of the Challenge Cup, a rugby league cup competition.

The competition ended with the final on 2 May 1998, which was played at Wembley Stadium.

The tournament was won by Sheffield Eagles, who beat Wigan Warriors 17–8 in the final, and is generally considered to be one of the biggest upsets in the history of the Challenge Cup final. The Lance Todd Trophy was won by Mark Aston.

First round
The first round consisted of 60 teams, including clubs in National Conference Division 1 and Division 2, and other amateur clubs from around the country. Additionally, Dublin Blues became the first ever Irish team to take part in the cup. Matches were played on 5–6 December 1997, with the replay being played on 13 December 1997.

Second round
The 30 winners of the previous round were joined by an additional 14 clubs from the National Conference Premier Division. Matches were played on 20–21 December 1997, with the replay and postponed matches being played on 27–28 December 1997.

Play-off
An additional play-off match between Oldham R.L.F.C. and one of the winners of the second round took place before the next round. This was due to Oldham being originally excluded from the cup, as the original club had been liquidated at the end of the previous season, but the Rugby Football League (RFL) later allowed the club to enter the competition following an appeal, with several of the remaining amateur clubs in the competition offering to play Oldham for a place in the next round. The match took place on 18 January 1998.

Third round
The 22 winners of the previous round were joined by an additional 18 clubs from the First Division and Second Division. Matches were played on 31 January and 1 February 1998.

Fourth round
The 20 winners of the previous round were joined by an additional 12 clubs from the Super League. Matches were played on 14–15 February 1998, with the replay being played on 18 February 1998.

Fifth round
Matches were played on 28 February and 1 March 1998.

Quarter finals
Matches were played on 14–15 March 1998.

Semi finals
The semi finals were played at neutral venues on 28 and 29 March 1998. Sheffield Eagles won 22–18 against Salford Reds, reaching the Challenge Cup final for the first time in their history, but the match was overshadowed when a man invaded the pitch and attacked referee Stuart Cummings immediately after the end of the game. Wigan Warriors won 38–8 in a one-sided game against London Broncos.

Final

References

External links
Challenge Cup official website 

Challenge Cup
Challenge Cup
1998 in Irish sport